James Cosh (27 June 1838 – 20 September 1900) was a Scottish-Australian missionary and academic. He was born near Stranraer, and studied at the University of Glasgow and the Royal College of Surgeons of Edinburgh before being ordained by the Reformed Presbyterian Church.

Cosh served for four years on Efate in the New Hebrides (now Vanuatu). He translated Genesis and John into the local language.

Cosh moved to Australia and served as a theological lecturer, before being appointed to the Hunter Baillie chair of Oriental and Polynesian Languages in St Andrew's College, University of Sydney in 1899.

J. Graham Miller suggests that Cosh's "devoted and distinguished service in Australia revealed the permanent value of those few brief years of missionary work on Efate."

References

1838 births
1900 deaths
People from Stranraer
Alumni of the University of Edinburgh
Scottish Presbyterian missionaries
Presbyterian missionaries in Vanuatu
Scottish emigrants to Australia
Translators of the Bible into Oceanic languages
Academic staff of the University of Sydney
19th-century translators
British expatriates in Vanuatu
Missionary linguists